Cyantraniliprole is an insecticide of the ryanoid class, specifically a diamide insecticide (IRAC MoA group 28). It is approved for use in the United States, Canada, China, and India.  Because of its uncommon mechanism of action as a ryanoid, it has activity against pests such as Diaphorina citri that have developed resistance to other classes of insecticides. 

Cyantraniliprole is highly toxic to bees, which delayed its initial registration as a pesticide in the United States.
As part of an ongoing court dispute by the Center for Biological Diversity, in November 2022, the U.S. Court of Appeals for the D.C. Circuit ordered the United States Environmental Protection Agency to consider harms to plants and animals under the Endangered Species Act, and put in place appropriate protections.

References

Insecticides
Benzamides
Nitriles
Pyridines
Pyrazoles